Wedowee is a town in Randolph County, Alabama, United States. At the 2010 census the population was 823, up from 818 in 2000. The small town is the county seat of Randolph County. It was initially incorporated in 1836, but its charter lapsed by the late 19th century. It was reincorporated in 1901.

Randolph County High School is located in Wedowee.

History
Wedowee, which means "old water" in the Creek language, was named after a Muscogee Creek Indian chief. This area was historically occupied by the Muscogee Creek people.

Following Indian Removal of the Creek in the 1830s to Indian Territory west of the Mississippi River by the US government, this area was settled by European Americans. The town of Wedowee was designated as the county seat of Randolph County in 1835. The county was developed for the cultivation of cotton as a commodity crop, with labor primarily done by enslaved African Americans, many of whom had been sold to the Deep South from the Upper South in the domestic slave trade.

Since the late 20th century, Lake Wedowee was created by the impoundment of the Tallapoosa River. This has enhanced the tourist drawing power of the town. Also known as the R. L. Harris Reservoir, the lake draws thousands of visitors to Wedowee every year.

Geography

Wedowee is located on the Piedmont plateau at  (33.308603, -85.485447). It is also located in the foothills of the Appalachian Mountains.

The city is located in the central part of Randolph County along U.S. Route 431, which is the main route through the city. U.S. 431 leads northwest 34 mi (55 km) to Oxford and southeast 13 mi (21 km) to Roanoke. Alabama State Route 48 also runs through the city, leading northeast 9 mi (14 km) to Woodland and west 16 mi (26 km) to Lineville.

Demographics

As of the census of 2000, there were 818 people, 337 households, and 200 families residing in the town. The racial makeup of the town was 68.70% White, 30.20% Black or African American, 0.12% Native American, 0.49% Asian, 0.24% from other races, and 0.24% from two or more races. 0.12% of the population were Hispanic or Latino of any race.

There were 337 households, out of which 26.1% had children under the age of 18 living with them, 43.0% were married couples living together, 13.6% had a female householder with no husband present, and 40.4% were non-families. 36.5% of all households were made up of individuals, and 22.0% had someone living alone who was 65 years of age or older. The average household size was 2.23 and the average family size was 2.95.

In the town, the population was spread out, with 21.8% under the age of 18, 8.9% from 18 to 24, 27.4% from 25 to 44, 21.6% from 45 to 64, and 20.3% who were 65 years of age or older. The median age was 39 years. For every 100 females, there were 97.6 males. For every 100 females age 18 and over, there were 95.1 males.

The median income for a household in the town was $26,136, and the median income for a family was $37,292. Males had a median income of $24,250 versus $22,250 for females. The per capita income for the town was $12,638. About 17.1% of families and 20.9% of the population were below the poverty line, including 25.7% of those under age 18 and 21.4% of those age 65 or over.

Notable people
Hulond Humphries – part-time hog farmer; former high school principal and district superintendent; caused a number of controversies in the 1990s as a result of his opposition to interracial dating
John Merrill – politician; current Secretary of State of Alabama
T. Jack Lee – sixth Director of the NASA Marshall Space Flight Center in Huntsville, Alabama, 1989-1994
Stanley O'Neal – former CEO of Merrill Lynch; currently on the board of Alcoa
William Hugh Smith – 21st Governor of Alabama, 1868-1870; serving during the Reconstruction era, he was the first Republican Governor of Alabama. He had moved with his parents to Wedowee in 1839, at the age of 13; read law under John T. Heflin of Wedowee. A historic marker now stands on the site of his family's home along N. Main Street (U.S. Route 431) in Wedowee.
Alvin Wright – former NFL defensive lineman

Gallery

References

External links
Wedowee article, Encyclopedia of Alabama

Towns in Randolph County, Alabama
Towns in Alabama
County seats in Alabama
Alabama placenames of Native American origin